Hlomla Dandala (born 22 September 1974) is a South African actor, television presenter, and director.

He is best known for his roles as Derek Nyathi in Isidingo (1998–2001), title character Jacob Makhubu in Jacob's Cross (since 2007), and host of the reality dating show All You Need Is Love from 2002 to 2003. He starred in the drama series Rockville as Gomorrah, the main antagonist of the third season, and e.tv's prime time soap opera, Scandal! as Kingsley Siseko Langa from 2016 until 2019.

As of 2018, Dandala stars in The River across Sindi Dlathu (who plays Lindiwe) as her husband, Commissioner Zweli Dikana. Dandala is the son of Mvume Dandala and has a sister Gqibelo. He speaks five languages: Afrikaans, English, Xhosa, Sesotho and Zulu.

Filmography

Television

Reality
   Channel O (1995  - 1998)
   All You Need Is Love (2000)

Series
 Isidingo (as Derek Nyathi, season 1-4)
Rockville (as Gomorrah, season 3)
 Jacob's Cross (as Jacob Makhubu, later Jacob Abayomi; since season 1)
 All You Need Is Love (host; 2002–2003)
 Interrogation Room
 Tsha Tsha (as Lungi, season 4)
 Gaz'lam (as Coltrane, seasons 3-4)
 Scout's Safari
 Zero Tolerance (second season, as Majola Tindleni)
 Jozi-H (as Dr. Sipho Ramthalile)
 Scandal! Which he also directed before (as Kingsley Siseko Langa)
 The River (as Zweli Dikana, season 1 - 5)
 The Republic (as Deputy President)
 Justice Served ( as Azania Maqoma )

Miniseries
 Land of Thirst (as Khanyiso Phalo)
 The Triangle (2005)
 Madiba (2017)

Film
 Fools (1997)
 Red Dust (2004)
 Lord of War (2005)
 Coup! (made for TV, 2006)
 Sniper Reloaded (2011)
 Winnie (2011) - Oliver Tambo
 Contract with Yvonne Okoro and Joseph Benjamin.
 Honeymoon Hotel (2014) with Beverly Naza and Martha Ankhoma.
 Momentum (as Mr. Madison)
 Happiness Is a Four Letter Word (2016) with Chris Attoh.

References

External links 

 

1974 births
Living people
People from Mdantsane
Xhosa people
South African male television actors
South African male film actors